The Baltic Bees Jet Team is a civilian aerobatic display team based in Tukums, Latvia, 60 km west of the capital, Riga. It flies six Czech Aero L-39 Albatros jets.

The team flies a display lasting around 20 minutes that includes formation flying, opposition passes, solo routines, and synchronized maneuvers.

They fly in shows in Western Europe, Eastern Europe, Russia, as well as in China.

References

External links

Official website

Aerobatic teams
Aviation in Latvia